Military rites are honors presented at a funeral for a member of a military or police force. These rites, which are performed (usually) at the burial, include the firing of rifles, presenting of a flag and or bugle calls. In Australia and New Zealand a Poppy Service is often held for members of the Armed Forces. This includes a short reading by a member of the Returned Services League of Australia or, in New Zealand, the Returned Services Association, the laying of red poppies on the coffin by all present, the playing of the Last Post (or Taps in the United States), Reveille, and recitation of the Ode of Remembrance.

See also
3-volley salute
21-gun salute
Burial at sea
Change of command
Color guard
Half-mast
Honor guard
Military funeral
Missing man formation
Riderless horse
State funeral
Tomb of the Unknown Soldier
United States military music customs

Ceremonies
Death customs
Military traditions